Cork Greyhound Stadium was a greyhound racing stadium on Western Road in Cork, Munster. It is not to be confused with Curraheen Park.

Origins 
The first greyhound track in Cork was known as The Show Grounds Greyhound Track and ran from 1928-1935 but closed on 20 September 1935 following the decision to relocate to a site nearer the city centre. The site chosen was between Western Road and the north bank of the River Lee near the Wellington Bridge.

Opening 
Less than one year after the closure of the circuit at the Showgrounds the second Cork track opened for business on 13 June 1936. Pat O’Brien was installed as the manager.

History
The Irish provincial tracks pressured the Irish Coursing Club for the right to stage Ireland's premier event, the Irish Greyhound Derby which had been exclusively run in Dublin. During a vote in 1939 the club agreed to let Limerick host the race followed by Cork in 1941 but due to the Foot-and-mouth disease in 1941 racing had ceased and when the ban on racing was lifted Cork unfortunately ruled themselves out from being able to host the event at such short notice.

In 1942 the chance to hold the Derby was taken despite the fact that Cork could not match the prize money offered by the Dublin tracks. Record crowds attended the event won by Uacterlainn Riac. Cork never hosted the Derby again but in 1944 the Laurels was inaugurated at the track over 500 yards and would soon become a classic race.

The Oaks was held at the track twice in 1939 and 1943 and a competition originally named the Pegasus Cup was also
introduced. The Pegasus Cup was renamed the Perpetual Challenge Trophy and later the Guinness Trophy. The Bord na gCon installed a new totalisator system at four tracks including Cork in 1960 and one year later the Laurels switched to the slightly longer distance of 525 yards. Laurels winners included Spanish Chestnut in 1949 and 1950 and the legendary Spanish Battleship took the competition in 1955. Cork bookmakers Liam Cashman sponsored the event for many years.

The Bord na gCon purchased the stadium in 1969 safeguarding the future of the track from redevelopment. The circumference of the track was 445 yards which consisted of race distances of 300, 310, 500, 525, 550, 70, 745 and 525 hurdles.

Closure
By the late 1980s the facilities were struggling to cope with the large Cork attendances and the Bord na gCon sold the site of the greyhound track in Cork in 1996 and purchased a green-field site in Curraheen on the western fringes of the city with the intention of building a brand new facility there. It took until the year 2000 for the Bord na gCon plans of a new track in Cork to come to fruition. The Western Road venue was redeveloped into the Western Gateway Building (science building of the University College Cork).

Competitions
 Irish Laurels
 Oaks
 Irish Greyhound Derby

Track records

References

1936 establishments in Ireland
2000 disestablishments in Ireland
Defunct greyhound racing venues in Ireland
Sport in County Cork
Sports venues in County Cork